Aileen Rae Morales is an American softball coach who is the current head coach at Georgia Tech.

Coaching career

Young Harris
On June 18, 2013, Aileen Morales was announced as the new head coach of the Young Harris softball program.

Radford
On June 26, 2015, Aileen Morales was announced as the new head coach of the Radford softball program.

Georgia Tech
On June 7, 2017, Aileen Morales was announced as the new head coach of the Georgia Tech softball program.

Head coaching record

College

References

Living people
Female sports coaches
American softball coaches
Georgia Tech Yellow Jackets softball players
Georgia Tech Yellow Jackets softball coaches
Young Harris Mountain Lions softball coaches
Radford Highlanders softball coaches
1987 births
21st-century American women